Twin Faces, also known as Press Button B,  is a 1937 British crime film directed by Lawrence Huntington and starring Anthony Ireland, Francesca Bahrle and Frank Birch. The film was made at Highbury Studios as a quota quickie for release by the Hollywood studio Paramount Pictures.

Cast
 Anthony Ireland as Jimmy the Climber  
 Francesca Bahrle as Judy Strangeways  
 Frank Birch as Ben Zwigi  
 Paul Neville as Cmdr. Strangeways  
 Victor Hagen as Inspector Coates  
 George Turner as Maurice  
 Ivan Wilmot as Levenstein  
 Frank Tickle as John Cedar

References

Bibliography
Chibnall, Steve. Quota Quickies: The Birth of the British 'B' Film. British Film Institute, 2007.
Low, Rachael. Filmmaking in 1930s Britain. George Allen & Unwin, 1985.
Wood, Linda. British Films, 1927–1939. British Film Institute, 1986.

External links

1937 films
British crime films
British black-and-white films
1937 crime films
Films directed by Lawrence Huntington
Films shot at Highbury Studios
1930s English-language films
1930s British films